Kashmore District, previously known as Khizmer or Khizmore, is a district of the province of Sindh, Pakistan. The capital city is Kandhkot. The district has a population of 1,090,336. Kashmore District is a part of Larkana Division. Its old name was Khizmer or Khizmor. The spoken languages are Sindhi and Balochi. Its border is connected with Punjab and Balochistan provinces. Kashmore city is gateway to Punjab province and Balochistan province. In 2004, Kashmore became a district after its separation from Jacobabad District.

Administrative divisions
Kashmor District is subdivided into three tehsils:

 Kashmore Tehsil
 Kandhkot Tehsil
 Tangwani Tehsil

The tehsils are further subdivided into union councils:

Agriculture
Kashmor District has a large cattle market.

Geography 
Kashmor District is located in the northern part of Sindh, bordering Ghotki, Jacobabad, Shikarpur and Sukkur within Sindh. It also borders Balochistan on one side and Punjab on the other. The Indus river runs through the Eastern side of Kashmor district. The southeastern side of Kashmor District has forest of "Kacha" that support wild animals. The Thar desert falls on the Eastern side of the district, and is home to wild desert animals.

Demography 
At the time of the 2017 census, Kashmore district had a population of 1,090,336, of which 253,659 (23.26%) lived in urban areas. Kashmore had a sex ratio of 931 females per 1000 males and a literacy rate of 30.58%: 41.76% for males and 18.59% for females.

The majority religion is Islam, with 96.73% of the population. Hinduism (including those from Scheduled Castes) is practiced by 3.22% of the population.

At the time of the 2017 census, 94.34% of the population spoke Sindhi, 2.99% Balochi and 1.05% Saraiki as their first language.

Kashmor City

Kandhkot is the district headquarters of Kashmor, and also an old city that lies on the right side of the Indus river. Kashmore City is a gateway to Punjab and Balochistan. In addition, the city’s main electricity comes from the Indus river.

List of Dehs
The following is a list of Kashmore District's dehs, organised by taluka:

 Kashmore Taluka (57 dehs)
 Badani Kacho
 Badani Pako
 Bai Rup
 Belo
 Bhanar
 Bindp Murad
 Buxapur
 Chachar
 Daro Jhando
 Domewali
 Elsi
 Gandheer
 Geehalpur
 Gishkori
 Gondak Kosh
 Gublo
 Gullanpur
 Haji Khan
 Jakhrani
 Jalal Sudh
 Kacho Bahadurpur
 Kacho Kashmore
 Kacho Khoski
 Karimabad
 Kath Garh
 Kauro Mahar
 Keejhar
 Khahi Kacho
 Khahi Pako
 Khewali
 Kubhar
 Kumb
 Kumbhri
 Line Purani
 Machhi
 Mahar
 Masoowalo
 Mekhan Bello
 Mithri
 Muhammadadani
 Noorpur Kacho
 Noorpur Pako
 Pako Bahadurpur
 Pako Kashmore
 Pako Khoski
 Rio Kacho
 Sain
 Samo
 Shah Ali Pur
 Shah Garh Kacho
 Shah Garh Pako
 Silachi
 Sodhi
 Sorah
 Thalho
 Toj
 Zor Garh
 Kandhkot Taluka (49 dehs)
 Aalamabad
 Akhero
 Arain
 Babarwari
 Balochabad
 Bilhari
 Buxpur
 Chaman
 Dadar
 Dari
 Dhabhani
 Dhandhi
 Dhao
 Lahri Domki
 Doulatpur
 Fareed abad
 Garhi
 Ghoraghar Katcho
 Ghoraghat Pako
 Ghouspur
 Gulabpur
 Haibat Katcho
 Haibat Pako
 Jaffarabad Katcho
 Jageerabad
 Jangin
 Kajli
 Kandhkot
 Keti
 Khairwah
 Khan wah
 Khanbhri
 Kundharo Katcho
 Machko
 Makan maro
 Makhwani
 Malguzar
 Malheer
 Malookan
 Mangi
 Mari
 Metahar
 Rasaldar
 Rejmatabad
 Shah Mohammad Jeelani
 Sunhiyanipur
 Teghani
 Wahidpur
 Wakro
 Tangwani Taluka (42 dehs)
 Allah abad
 Bahalkani
 Bargh
 Beghoo
 Bijarani
 Cheel
 Dabli
 Duniyapur
 Gazi
 Ghano Khoso
 Gudo
 Gulwali
 Hajano
 Hazaro
 Heeranpur
 Jaffarabad
 Jamal
 Jhalo
 Karampur
 Kair
 Khairo
 Kot dothi
 Lalao
 Lashari
 Manjhi
 Mari Jafar
 Nar
 Naseer
 Ninde ji Dhori
 Qureshi
 Saido kot
 Saifal
 Salghni
 Sanheri
 Sawan Gabol
 Shah gazi
 Sher garh
 Sherhan
 Sorwah
 Suhliyani
 Tangwani
 Unar

Notes

References

Bibliography

Kashmore District
Districts of Sindh